Chaplin is an unincorporated community and census-designated place in Nelson County, Kentucky, United States. Its population was 418 as of the 2010 census. Chaplin has a post office with ZIP code 40012, which opened on January 4, 1832. U.S. Route 62 passes through the community.

Geography

Demographics

References

Unincorporated communities in Nelson County, Kentucky
Unincorporated communities in Kentucky
Census-designated places in Nelson County, Kentucky
Census-designated places in Kentucky